Events from the year 1880 in Russia.

Incumbents
 Monarch – Alexander II

Events

 
 
  
  
 Trial of the Sixteen (1880)
 Berdichev machine-building plant
 Moscow Circus on Tsvetnoy Boulevard

Births
 July 28 – Volodymyr Vynnychenko, 1st Prime Minister of Ukraine (d. 1951)
 September 14 - Metropolitan Benjamin (Fedchenkov), Eastern Orthodox missionary and writer, Exarch of the Russian Church in North America (d. 1961)
 December 1 – Joseph Trumpeldor, Zionist activist (d. 1920)

Deaths

References

1880 in Russia
Years of the 19th century in the Russian Empire